The Balta is a left tributary of the river Topolnița in Romania. It flows into the Topolnița in Sfodea.

References

Rivers of Romania
Rivers of Mehedinți County